The 2016 Manitoba Scotties Tournament of Hearts, the provincial women's curling championship of Manitoba, was held from January 20 to 24 at the Sun Gro Centre in Beausejour. The winning Kerri Einarson team represented Manitoba at the 2016 Scotties Tournament of Hearts in Grande Prairie, Alberta.

Teams
The teams are listed as follows:

Round-robin standings

Round-robin results

January 20
Draw 1
Brown 5-4 Link
McDonald 11-3 Ursel
Montford 7-6 MacKay
Birchard 6-3 Zacharias

Draw 2
Overton-Clapham 10-4 Rolles
Menard 9-7 Spencer 
Reed 11-10 Einarson
Robertson 12-3 Harvey

Draw 3
McDonald 8-4 MacKay   
Birchard 7-5 Link
Brown 5-4 Zacharias
Montford 8-5 Ursel

Draw 4
Einarson 8-3 Menard  
Overton-Clapham 9-5 Harvey
Robertson 10-4 Rolles  
Spencer 9-6 Reed

January 21
Draw 5
Montford 8-4 Link
Brown 8-5 Ursel
Birchard 8-3 MacKay
McDonald 8-3 Zacharias

Draw 6
Spencer 9-8 Harvey
Robertson 10-6 Reed
Overton-Clapham 6-3 Menard
Einarson 7-1 Rolles

Draw 7
Birchard 9-1 Ursel   
McDonald 9-5 Link
Montford 10-3 Zacharias   
MacKay 7-5 Brown

Draw 8
Overton-Clapham 9-3 Reed  
Einarson 8-1 Harvey
Rolles 6-5 Spencer
Menard 7-5 Robertson

January 22
Draw 9
Spencer 9-2 Robertson
Menard 10-6 Rolles
Reed 8-4 Harvey  
Einarson 8-5 Overton-Clapham

Draw 10
Brown 12-7 Montford  
MacKay 7-4 Zacharias
Link 10-2 Ursel
McDonald 9-4 Birchard

Draw 11
Menard 7-6 Reed
Overton-Clapham 6-4 Robertson 
Einarson 12-2 Spencer
Harvey 8-5 Rolles

Draw 12
MacKay 8-4 Ursel
Birchard 8-3 Brown vs. 
McDonald 6-4 Montford
Zacharias 10-3 Link

January 23
Draw 13
Einarson 9-5 Robertson
Reed 9-6 Rolles
Menard 7-6 Harvey   
Overton-Clapham 5-4 Spencer

Draw 14
Brown 9-5 McDonald  
Ursel 9-3 Zacharias
MacKay 7-2 Link   
Birchard 6-5 Montford

Playoffs

R1 vs B1
Saturday, January 23, 6:00 pm

R2 vs B2
Saturday, January 23, 6:00 pm

Semifinal
Sunday, January 24, 9:00 am

Final
Sunday, January 24, 1:30 pm

References

2016 Scotties Tournament of Hearts
2016 in Manitoba
Curling in Manitoba
January 2016 sports events in Canada